Travis Meyer (born 8 June 1989 in Viveash) is an Australian former professional racing cyclist, who rode professionally between 2010 and 2016. His first Pro Tour race was the 2009 Tour Down Under. At the beginning of 2010 he was the winner of the Australian National Road Race Championships elite road race.

Personal life

Major results

2006
 UCI Junior Track World Championships
1st  Madison
1st  Team pursuit
2007
 UCI Juniors World Championships
1st  Individual pursuit
1st  Scratch
1st  Team pursuit
10th Road race
2008
 1st  Overall Tour de Berlin
 1st  Overall Tour of Wellington
1st Stages 3 & 7
 3rd Time trial, National Under-23 Road Championships
 7th Overall Ronde de l'Isard
2009
 1st  Team pursuit, National Track Championships
 1st Overall Tour de Perth
 2nd Time trial, National Under-23 Road Championships
 10th Overall Tour of Japan
2010
 1st  Road race, National Road Championships
 5th Gran Premio Nobili Rubinetterie
2015
 8th Overall Tour de Taiwan
 9th Overall Tour de Korea
2017
 6th Road race, National Road Championships

Grand Tour general classification results timeline

References

External links

1989 births
Living people
Australian male cyclists
Cyclists from Perth, Western Australia
Australian track cyclists
Sportsmen from Western Australia
20th-century Australian people
21st-century Australian people